The Santa Marta montane forests (NT0159) is an ecoregion in the Sierra Nevada de Santa Marta, a massif on the Caribbean coast of northern Colombia.
The isolation of the massif and the range of elevations and climates has resulted in a wide variety of species including many endemics. 
The lower levels contained tropical rainforest, which has largely been cleared.
Higher up, this gives way to cloud forest. 
Much of this has also been cleared for coffee plantations, pasture for sheep and cattle, and farming.

Geography

Location
The range rises to snow-covered peaks only  from the Caribbean sea.
The ecoregion is almost entirely surrounded by the Sinú Valley dry forests ecoregion. 
To the northeast and northwest it transitions directly into Guajira–Barranquilla xeric scrub.
In the higher elevations of the mountains the ecoregion gives way to Santa Marta páramo.

Terrain

The northern edge is parallel to the Caribbean coast. 
The southwestern edge descends to the dry and warm Magdalena River alluvial plain and the Ciénaga Grande de Santa Marta marshes.
The southeastern edge adjoins the valleys of the Cesar River and Ranchería River.

Volcanic rocks from the Mesozoic (252–66 Ma) and Tertiary (65–2.58 Ma) eras include batholiths of granite, diorite and quartz monzonite, and there are areas of sedimentary rocks.
The massif was pushed up to its present height in the Miocene (23–5.33 Ma) and Late Pleistocene (126,000–11,700 years ago).

Climate

Rain is carried by the northeast trade winds, with wet seasons from September to December and from May to July.
At a sample location at  the Köppen climate classification is Cwb: warm temperate, winter dry, warm summer.

Ecology
The ecoregion is in the neotropical realm, in the tropical and subtropical moist broadleaf forests biome.
The isolated location surrounded by dry forests has allowed many endemic species of flora and fauna to develop.
It is seen as a biological and geographic island, distinct from the Andes.
However, there are similarities to the Serranía del Perijá, to the east, which is normally included in the Cordillera Oriental montane forests.
76% of bird species in Perijá are shared with the Sierra Nevada de Santa Marta. 80% of Perijá's butterflies in the Ithomiinae and Heliconiinae families is shared with the Sierra Nevada, but only 40% with the eastern slope of the Cordillera Oriental further to the south.

The ecoregion is part of the Northern Andean Montane Forests global ecoregion, which includes the Magdalena Valley montane forests, Venezuelan Andes montane forests, Northwestern Andean montane forests, Cauca Valley montane forests, Cordillera Oriental montane forests, Santa Marta montane forests and Eastern Cordillera Real montane forests terrestrial ecoregions.

Flora

There are warm, wet forests on the north of the massif and part of the west, isolated from similar forests elsewhere.
These tropical rain forests at altitudes up to  have trees that may reach  in height depending on rainfall.
The understory contains tree ferns and grasses with large leaves.
There are some endemic species, but relatively low diversity compared to other neotropical ecoregions.
These forests are considered to be a Pleistocene refuge.
There are few species in common with the cloud forests higher up, but there are similarities to wet forests elsewhere in Colombia, in Panama and Venezuela, and at a family level to forests in the Amazon.

Above  the trees and palms are smaller, and include Zygia longifolia, forest acai (Euterpe precatoria), Súrtuba (Geonoma interrupta) and spiny treefern (Cyathea pungens).
The forests include vascular epiphytes such as Vriesea elata and droophead tufted airplant (Guzmania lingulata), understory plants with large leaves such as Rattlesnake Plant (Calathea insignis) and dumb cane (Dieffenbachia longispatha), and mosses and liverworts such as Octoblepharum albidum and Leucomium strumosum.

There are cloud forests above , with vegetation related to the forests of the tropical Andes and the higher elevations in  the Caribbean, which contain many endemic species.
In some areas the cloud forest dips down to lower levels.
The flowering plant families with the largest numbers of genera are Asteraceae, Orchidaceae, Fabaceae and Rubiaceae.
The genera Monochaetum and Tillandsia each have five endemic species.
The family Melastomataceae has 13 endemic species.

Andean royal palms (Dictyocarium lamarckianum) emerge from the cloud forest canopy, and dominate wet and sloping areas.
Other cloud forest tree species include palo azul (Calatola costaricensis), Cavendishia callista, Graffenrieda santamartensis, Gustavia speciosa and Tovomita weddelliana. 
The understory includes tree ferns, palms, prop-root plants, vascular epiphytes and woody lianas. 
There are many Bryophytes such as the thallose liverwort Dumortiera hirsuta and the moss Phyllogonium fulgens.

Typical tree species are wax palm (Ceroxylon ceriferum), Chaetolepis santamartensis, Chusquea tuberculosa, Hesperomeles ferruginea, Monochaetum uberrimum, Myrcianthes myrsinoides, Myrsine coriacea, Paragynoxys undatifolia, Pino de Pasto (Podocarpus oleifolius) and Weinmannia pinnata.
Bryophytes and lichens include Anastrophyllum auritum, Musgo (Campylopus benedictii), bonfire moss (Funaria hygrometrica) and Hypotrachyna gigas.

Fauna

Mammal species include the Central American agouti (Dasyprocta punctata), jaguar (Panthera onca), lowland paca (Cuniculus paca). neotropical otter (Lontra longicaudis), ocelot (Leopardus pardalis), South American tapir (Tapirus terrestris), Venezuelan red howler (Alouatta seniculus) and white-lipped peccary (Tayassu pecari).
Endemic mammals include the red-tailed squirrel (Sciurus granatensis), Tomes's rice rat (Nephelomys albigularis) and unicolored Oldfield mouse (Thomasomys monochromos).
Endangered mammals include the red-crested tree-rat (Santamartamys rufodorsalis).

Bird species include bay-headed tanager (Tangara gyrola), black-chested jay (Cyanocorax affinis), blue-billed curassow (Crax alberti), coppery emerald (Chlorostilbon russatus), crested guan (Penelope purpurascens), keel-billed toucan (Ramphastos sulfuratus), Santa Marta blossomcrown (Anthocephala floriceps), scarlet-fronted parakeet (Psittacara wagleri) and white-tipped quetzal (Pharomachrus fulgidus).

Birds with restricted ranges include black-backed thornbill (Ramphomicron dorsale), green-bearded helmetcrest (Oxypogon guerinii), montane woodcreeper (Lepidocolaptes lacrymiger), mountain velvetbreast (Lafresnaya lafresnayi), Santa Marta parakeet (Pyrrhura viridicata), strong-billed woodcreeper (Xiphocolaptes promeropirhynchus), white-tipped quetzal (Pharomachrus fulgidus) and yellow-crowned whitestart (Myioborus flavivertex).
Endemic birds include the Santa Marta parakeet (Pyrrhura viridicata) and white-tailed starfrontlet (Coeligena phalerata).
Endangered birds include the black-and-chestnut eagle (Spizaetus isidori), black-backed thornbill (Ramphomicron dorsale), blue-billed curassow (Crax alberti), Santa Marta bush tyrant (Myiotheretes pernix), Santa Marta parakeet (Pyrrhura viridicata), Santa Marta sabrewing (Campylopterus phainopeplus) and Santa Marta wren (Troglodytes monticola).

There are many species of reptiles and amphibians.
Endemic sauria include the Colombian Clawed Gecko (Pseudogonatodes furvus), Ptychoglossus romaleos, Proctoporus specularis and Santa Marta Anole (Anolis santamartae), 
Amphibians include several Pristimantis species, mostly at the higher elevations, including Cebolleta Robber Frog (Pristimantis tayrona), Cristina's Robber Frog (Pristimantis cristinae), Ruthven's Robber Frog (Pristimantis ruthveni) and Santa Marta robber frog (Pristimantis sanctaemartae). 
The only endemic amphibian genus of the Sierra Nevada includes Walker's Sierra frog (Geobatrachus walkeri).
Endangered amphibians include Atelopus arsyecue, Guajira stubfoot toad (Atelopus carrikeri), Harlequin frog (Atelopus laetissimus), Nahumae stubfoot toad (Atelopus nahumae), Walker's stubfoot toad (Atelopus walkeri), Santa Marta poison arrow frog (Colostethus ruthveni), Boulenger's backpack frog (Cryptobatrachus boulengeri), Walker's sierra frog (Geobatrachus walkeri), Ground robber frog (Pristimantis insignitus) and Ruthven's robber frog (Pristimantis ruthveni).

Status

The World Wide Fund for Nature (WWF) gives the region the status of "Vulnerable".
The massif was settled in the Pre-Columbian era, and traces of these communities remain.
Areas of the ecoregion have been sporadically occupied since the end of the 19th century.
From 70% to 80% of the original forest has been cleared in the last 50 years.
The wet forest of the lower levels has been reduced to thinned-out fragments by settlements, marijuana and coca cultivation, logging, extraction of firewood and conversion to pasture.
Deforestation causes erosion, mud slides in the rainy seasons and silting of the rivers.

In the late 19th century large belts of forest at the middle levels were converted to coffee cultivation.
Large areas of forest have also been cleared to create pasture, kept clear by annual burns.
Higher up, the Ancho and Frío river basins and other parts of the cloud forest have been modified to make space for sheep and cattle rearing, farming of potatoes and fruit, and extraction of wood.
Forests clearance has threatened the populations of large animals, which are also hunted for food, for their skins, or as perceived threats to cattle.
Roads opened to the higher areas have led to looting of pre-Columbian sites, hunting and extraction of firewood.

A 2006 book reported that of the  Santa Marta montane forests 33.4% had been transformed by human activity. 
Parts of the ecoregion are theoretically protected by the Sierra Nevada de Santa Marta National Park, Tayrona National Natural Park and Sierra Nevada de Santa Marta Biosphere Reserve, but these areas were still being cleared in 1998.
The indigenous reserves of the Cogui, Arsario and Arhuaco people overlap the Sierra Nevada de Santa Marta National Park.

Notes

Sources

Ecoregions of Colombia
Sierra Nevada de Santa Marta

Trees of Colombia
Neotropical tropical and subtropical moist broadleaf forests
Andean forests
Montane forests